The 2009–10 Golden State Warriors season was the 64th National Basketball Association (NBA) season for the Golden State Warriors basketball franchise and the first season for the league's only unanimous MVP Stephen Curry, widely considered the greatest shooter in basketball history and one of the most influential players of all time.

Draft

Roster

Pre-season

|- style="background:#cfc;"
| 1
| October 4
| L.A. Clippers
| 
| Anthony Morrow (21)
| Kelenna Azubuike (10)
| Stephen Curry (9)
| Oracle Arena11,204
| 1–0
|- style="background:#fcc;"
| 2
| October 7
| @ L.A. Lakers
| 
| Anthony Morrow (25)
| Anthony Randolph (12)
| Stephen Jackson (5)
| Honda Center13,156
| 1–1
|- style="background:#cfc;"
| 3
| October 9
| @ L.A. Lakers
| 
| Monta Ellis (24)
| Andris Biedriņš (12)
| Ellis, Curry (8)
| The Forum17,505
| 2–1
|- style="background:#cfc;"
| 4
| October 10
| @ Phoenix
| 
| Anthony Morrow (30)
| Andris Biedriņš (15)
| Stephen Curry (7)
| Indian Wells Tennis Garden14,979
| 3–1
|- style="background:#fcc;"
| 5
| October 12
| @ L.A. Clippers
| 
| Anthony Morrow (32)
| Andris Biedriņš (9)
| Monta Ellis (7)
| Staples Center10,238
| 3–2
|- style="background:#fcc;"
| 6
| October 17
| @ Sacramento
| 
| Corey Maggette (28)
| Andris Biedriņš (8)
| 3 players tied (4)
| Sleep Train Arena11,009
| 3–3
|- style="background:#fcc;"
| 7
| October 20
| @ L.A. Lakers
| 
| Anthony Morrow (24)
| Ronny Turiaf (12)
| Stephen Jackson (10)
| Citizens Business Bank Arena10,410
| 3–4
|- style="background:#cfc;"
| 8
| October 22
| New Orleans
| 
| Anthony Morrow (34)
| Ronny Turiaf (11)
| Stephen Curry (10)
| Oracle Arena15,123
| 4–4

Standings

Record vs. opponents

Regular season

Game log

|- bgcolor="#ffcccc"
| 1
| October 28
| Houston
| 
| Monta Ellis (26)
| Corey Maggette (9)
| Stephen Curry (7)
| Oracle Arena19,596
| 0–1
|- bgcolor="#ffcccc"
| 2
| October 30
| @ Phoenix
| 
| Monta Ellis (19)
| Andris Biedriņš (10)
| Curry, Biedriņš (4)
| US Airways Center18,422
| 0–2

|- bgcolor="#bbffbb"
| 3
| November 4
| Memphis
| 
| Ellis, Morrow (24)
| Andris Biedriņš (8)
| Monta Ellis (12)
| Oracle Arena17,457
| 1–2
|- bgcolor="#ffcccc"
| 4
| November 6
| L.A. Clippers
| 
| Anthony Morrow (18)
| Anthony Randolph (14)
| Monta Ellis (6)
| Oracle Arena18,788
| 1–3
|- bgcolor="#ffcccc"
| 5
| November 8
| @ Sacramento
| 
| Stephen Jackson (21)
| Kelenna Azubuike (7)
| Stephen Curry (6)
| ARCO Arena10,760
| 1–4
|- bgcolor="#bbffbb"
| 6
| November 9
| Minnesota
| 
| Kelenna Azubuike (31)
| Monta Ellis (10)
| Stephen Jackson (15)
| Oracle Arena15,468
| 2–4
|- bgcolor="#ffcccc"
| 7
| November 11
| @ Indiana
| 
| Corey Maggette (21)
| Anthony Randolph (13)
| Monta Ellis (5)
| Conseco Fieldhouse10,682
| 2–5
|- bgcolor="#bbffbb"
| 8
| November 13
| @ New York
| 
| Stephen Jackson (23)
| Stephen Jackson (8)
| Kelenna Azubuike (5)
| Madison Square Garden19,763
| 3–5
|- bgcolor="#ffcccc"
| 9
| November 14
| @ Milwaukee
| 
| Monta Ellis (26)
| Anthony Randolph (6)
| Stephen Jackson (5)
| Bradley Center14,978
| 3–6
|- bgcolor="#ffcccc"
| 10
| November 17
| @ Cleveland
| 
| Monta Ellis (23)
| Corey Maggette (11)
| Monta Ellis (8)
| Quicken Loans Arena20,562
| 3–7
|- bgcolor="#ffcccc"
| 11
| November 18
| @ Boston
| 
| Corey Maggette (23)
| Maggette, Randolph (8)
| Stephen Curry (7)
| TD Garden18,624
| 3–8
|- bgcolor="#bbffbb"
| 12
| November 20
| Portland
| 
| Monta Ellis (34)
| Anthony Randolph (11)
| Curry, Ellis (8)
| Oracle Arena18,630
| 4–8
|- bgcolor="#bbffbb"
| 13
| November 24
| @ Dallas
| 
| Monta Ellis (37)
| Vladimir Radmanović (12)
| Monta Ellis (8)
| American Airlines Center20,008
| 5–8
|- bgcolor="#ffcccc"
| 14
| November 25
| @ San Antonio
| 
| Monta Ellis (42)
| Curry, Randolph (7)
| Stephen Curry (5)
| AT&T Center17,606
| 5–9
|- bgcolor="#ffcccc"
| 15
| November 28
| L.A. Lakers
| 
| Monta Ellis (18)
| Vladimir Radmanović (10)
| Stephen Curry (8)
| Oracle Arena20,001
| 5–10
|- bgcolor="#bbffbb"
| 16
| November 30
| Indiana
| 
| Monta Ellis (45)
| 3 players tied (6)
| Watson, Maggette (6)
| Oracle Arena16,574
| 6–10

|- bgcolor= "#ffcccc"
| 17
| December 1
| @ Denver
| 
| Anthony Morrow (27)
| Corey Maggette (7)
| Stephen Curry (6)
| Pepsi Center14,570
| 6–11
|-
|- bgcolor= "#ffcccc"
| 18
| December 3
| Houston
| 
| Monta Ellis (24)
| Vladimir Radmanović (8)
| Monta Ellis (8)
| Oracle Arena16,432
| 6–12
|- bgcolor= "#ffcccc"
| 19
| December 5
| Orlando
| 
| Monta Ellis (33)
| Anthony Randolph (13)
| Monta Ellis (7)
| Oracle Arena19,054
| 6–13
|- bgcolor= "#ffcccc"
| 20
| December 7
| @ Oklahoma City
| 
| Monta Ellis (31)
| Vladimir Radmanović (8)
| C. J. Watson (3)
| Ford Center17,334
| 6–14
|- bgcolor="#bbffbb"
| 21
| December 9
| @ New Jersey
| 
| Ellis, Watson (18)
| 3 players tied (9)
| Monta Ellis (8)
| Izod Center10,005
| 7–14
|- bgcolor= "#ffcccc"
| 22
| December 11
| @ Chicago
| 
| Monta Ellis (27)
| Corey Maggette (10)
| Monta Ellis (5)
| United Center18,803
| 7–15
|- bgcolor= "#ffcccc"
| 23
| December 12
| @ Detroit
| 
| Monta Ellis (29)
| Monta Ellis (7)
| C. J. Watson (6)
| The Palace of Auburn Hills16,952
| 7–16
|- bgcolor= "#ffcccc"
| 24
| December 14
| @ Philadelphia
| 
| Corey Maggette (24)
| Randolph, Radmanović (5)
| Curry, Morrow (4)
| Wachovia Center12,795
| 7–17
|- bgcolor= "#ffcccc"
| 25
| December 16
| San Antonio
| 
| Monta Ellis (35)
| C. J. Watson (7)
| Ellis, Maggette (5)
| Oracle Arena17,857
| 7–18
|- bgcolor= "#ffcccc"
| 26
| December 18
| Washington
| 
| Monta Ellis (30)
| Anthony Randolph (9)
| Monta Ellis (7)
| Oracle Arena17,423
| 7–19
|- bgcolor= "#ffcccc"
| 27
| December 22
| @ Memphis
| 
| Corey Maggette (25)
| Stephen Curry (7)
| Stephen Curry (8)
| FedExForum12,827
| 7–20
|- bgcolor= "#ffcccc"
| 28
| December 23
| @ New Orleans
| 
| Monta Ellis (35)
| Curry, Maggette (10)
| Stephen Curry (7)
| New Orleans Arena14,391
| 7–21
|- bgcolor="#bbffbb"
| 29
| December 26
| Phoenix
| 
| Ellis, Maggette (33)
| Corey Maggette (8)
| Monta Ellis (10)
| Oracle Arena19,550
| 8–21
|- bgcolor="#bbffbb"
| 30
| December 28
| Boston
| 
| Monta Ellis (37)
| Vladimir Radmanović (10)
| C. J. Watson (7)
| Oracle Arena19,259
| 9–21
|- bgcolor="#ffcccc"
| 31
| December 29
| @ L.A. Lakers
| 
| Corey Maggette (25)
| Andris Biedriņš (8)
| Monta Ellis (7)
| Staples Center18,997
| 9–22

|- bgcolor="#ffcccc"
| 32
| January 2
| @ Portland
| 
| Monta Ellis (30)
| Anthony Randolph (11)
| Monta Ellis (4)
| Rose Garden20,507
| 9–23
|- bgcolor="#ffcccc"
| 33
| January 5
| @ Denver
| 
| Corey Maggette (35)
| Corey Maggette (7)
| Curry, Ellis (6)
| Pepsi Center15,129
| 9–24
|- bgcolor="#bbffbb"
| 34
| January 6
| @ Minnesota
| 
| Corey Maggette (28)
| Corey Maggette (10)
| Monta Ellis (6)
| Target Center12,046
| 10–24
|- bgcolor="#bbffbb"
| 35
| January 8
| Sacramento
| 
| Monta Ellis (39)
| Andris Biedriņš (9)
| Monta Ellis (6)
| Oracle Arena18,327
| 11–24
|- bgcolor="#ffcccc"
| 36
| January 11
| Cleveland
| 
| Corey Maggette (32)
| Vladimir Radmanović (9)
| Curry, Ellis (5)
| Oracle Arena19,596
| 11–25
|- bgcolor="#ffcccc"
| 37
| January 13
| Miami
| 
| Corey Maggette (25)
| Andris Biedriņš (8)
| Monta Ellis (9)
| Oracle Arena17,121
| 11–26
|- bgcolor="#ffcccc"
| 38
| January 15
| Milwaukee
| 
| Monta Ellis (33)
| Andris Biedriņš (10)
| Monta Ellis (8)
| Oracle Arena17,455
| 11–27
|- bgcolor="#bbffbb"
| 39
| January 18
| Chicago
| 
| Monta Ellis (36)
| Andris Biedriņš (19)
| Monta Ellis (8)
| Oracle Arena19,208
| 12–27
|- bgcolor="#ffcccc"
| 40
| January 20
| Denver
| 
| Monta Ellis (39)
| Andris Biedriņš (13)
| Monta Ellis (10)
| Oracle Arena17,223
| 12–28
|- bgcolor="#bbffbb"
| 41
| January 22
| New Jersey
| 
| Stephen Curry (32)
| Tolliver, Biedriņš (10)
| Stephen Curry (7)
| Oracle Arena17,308
| 13–28
|- bgcolor="#ffcccc"
| 42
| January 23
| @ Phoenix
| 
| Corey Maggette (27)
| Anthony Tolliver (11)
| Corey Maggette (4)
| US Airways Center17,792
| 13–29
|- bgcolor="#ffcccc
| 43
| January 26
| @ Sacramento
| 
| Stephen Curry (27)
| Corey Maggette (12)
| Stephen Curry (6)
| ARCO Arena14,522
| 13–30
|- bgcolor="#ffcccc"
| 44
| January 27
| New Orleans
| 
| C. J. Watson (23)
| Monta Ellis (6)
| Monta Ellis (9)
| Oracle Arena16,308
| 13–31
|- bgcolor="#ffcccc"
| 45
| January 29
| Charlotte
| 
| Corey Maggette (25)
| Andris Biedriņš (7)
| Stephen Curry (9)
| Oracle Arena17,850
| 13–32
|- bgcolor="#ffcccc"
| 46
| January 31
| @ Oklahoma City
| 
| Corey Maggette (26)
| Ronny Turiaf (8)
| Coby Karl (6)
| Ford Center17,565
| 13–33

|- bgcolor="#ffcccc"
| 47
| February 2
| @ Houston
| 
| Monta Ellis (34)
| Andris Biedriņš (8)
| Coby Karl (7)
| Toyota Center12,845
| 13–34
|- bgcolor="#ffcccc"
| 48
| February 3
| @ Dallas
| 
| Monta Ellis (46)
| Maggette, Biedriņš (9)
| Curry, Biedriņš (3)
| American Airlines Center19,679
| 13–35
|- bgcolor="#ffcccc"
| 49
| February 6
| Oklahoma City
| 
| Corey Maggette (24)
| Andris Biedriņš (18)
| Monta Ellis (6)
| Oracle Arena17,825
| 13–36
|- bgcolor="#ffcccc"
| 50
| February 8
| Dallas
| 
| Anthony Morrow (33)
| Morrow, Tolliver (11)
| Stephen Curry (9)
| Oracle Arena17,015
| 13–37
|- bgcolor="#bbffbb"
| 51
| February 10
| L.A. Clippers
| 
| Stephen Curry (36)
| Curry, Morrow (10)
| Stephen Curry (13)
| Oracle Arena17,230
| 14–37
|- bgcolor="#ffcccc"
| 52
| February 16
| @ L.A. Lakers
| 
| Anthony Morrow (23)
| Stephen Curry (10)
| Stephen Curry (8)
| Staples Center18,997
| 14–38
|- bgcolor="#bbffbb"
| 53
| February 17
| Sacramento
| 
| C. J. Watson (40)
| Anthony Tolliver (8)
| Stephen Curry (15)
| Oracle Arena17,023
| 15–38
|- bgcolor="#ffcccc"
| 54
| February 19
| Utah
| 
| C. J. Watson (22)
| Chris Hunter, Biedriņš (9)
| Stephen Curry (7)
| Oracle Arena18,322
| 15–39
|- bgcolor="#bbffbb"
| 55
| February 21
| Atlanta
| 
| Stephen Curry (32)
| Andris Biedriņš (13)
| C. J. Watson (6)
| Oracle Arena17,822
| 16–39
|- bgcolor="#ffcccc"
| 56
| February 23
| Philadelphia
| 
| Monta Ellis (22)
| Chris Hunter (8)
| Stephen Curry (5)
| Oracle Arena17,115
| 16–40
|- bgcolor="#ffcccc
| 57
| February 25
| Denver
| 
| Stephen Curry (30)
| Devean George (9)
| Stephen Curry (13)
| Oracle Arena18,555
| 16–41
|- bgcolor="#bbffbb"
| 58
| February 27
| Detroit
| 
| Stephen Curry (27)
| Anthony Tolliver (14)
| 3 players tied (5)
| Oracle Arena17,223
| 17–41

|- bgcolor="#ffcccc"
| 59
| March 2
| @ Miami
| 
| Anthony Morrow (24)
| Anthony Tolliver (8)
| Stephen Curry (8)
| American Airlines Arena15,213
| 17–42
|- bgcolor="#ffcccc"
| 60
| March 3
| @ Orlando
| 
| C. J. Watson (18)
| Williams, George (6)
| Stephen Curry (7)
| Amway Arena17,461
| 17–43
|- bgcolor="#ffcccc"
| 61
| March 5
| @ Atlanta
| 
| Stephen Curry (31)
| Ronny Turiaf (10)
| Stephen Curry (11)
| Philips Arena14,066
| 17–44
|- bgcolor="#ffcccc"
| 62
| March 6
| @ Charlotte
| 
| Stephen Curry (25)
| Chris Hunter (13)
| Anthony Tolliver (5)
| Time Warner Cable Arena19,392
| 17–45
|- bgcolor="#ffcccc"
| 63
| March 8
| @ New Orleans
| 
| Morrow, Williams (28)
| Anthony Tolliver (5)
| C. J. Watson (7)
| New Orleans Arena13,889
| 17–46
|- bgcolor="#ffcccc"
| 64
| March 11
| Portland
| 
| Corey Maggette (24)
| Anthony Tolliver (11)
| Maggette, C. J. Watson (6)
| Oracle Arena17,308
| 17–47
|- bgcolor="#bbffbb"
| 65
| March 13
| Toronto
| 
| Stephen Curry (35)
| Anthony Tolliver (11)
| Stephen Curry (10)
| Oracle Arena17,655
| 18–47
|- bgcolor="#ffcccc"
| 66
| March 15
| L.A. Lakers
| 
| Stephen Curry (29)
| Chris Hunter (14)
| Monta Ellis (11)
| Oracle Arena20,038
| 18–48
|- bgcolor="#bbffbb"
| 67
| March 17
| New Orleans
| 
| Anthony Tolliver (30)
| Chris Hunter (8)
| Monta Ellis (13)
| Oracle Arena17,155
| 19–48
|- bgcolor="ffcccc"
| 68
| March 19
| @ San Antonio
| 
| Monta Ellis (39)
| Reggie Williams (9)
| C. J. Watson (7)
| AT&T Center18,581
| 19–49
|- bgcolor="#ffcccc
| 69
| March 20
| @ Memphis
| 
| Monta Ellis (28)
| Anthony Tolliver (11)
| Stephen Curry (6)
| FedExForum14,897
| 19–50
|- bgcolor="#ffcccc"
| 70
| March 22
| Phoenix
| 
| Monta Ellis (30)
| Anthony Tolliver (12)
| Stephen Curry (8)
| Oracle Arena18,722
| 19–51
|- bgcolor="#bbffbb"
| 71
| March 24
| Memphis
| 
| Stephen Curry (30)
| Chris Hunter (10)
| Stephen Curry (11)
| Oracle Arena17,123
| 20–51
|- bgcolor="#ffcccc"
| 72
| March 27
| Dallas
| 
| Corey Maggette (21)
| Anthony Tolliver (21)
| Stephen Curry (6)
| Oracle Arena19,104
| 20–52
|- bgcolor="#bbffbb"
| 73
| March 28
| @ L.A. Clippers
| 
| Reggie Williams (25)
| Ronny Turiaf (8)
| Curry, Williams (7)
| Staples Center17,868
| 21–52
|- bgcolor="#ffcccc"
| 74
| March 31
| @ Utah
| 
| Corey Maggette (22)
| Chris Hunter (8)
| Stephen Curry (6)
| EnergySolutions Arena19,617
| 21–53

|- bgcolor="#bbffbb"
| 75
| April 2
| New York
| 
| Anthony Morrow (35)
| Anthony Tolliver (8)
| Stephen Curry (10)
| Oracle Arena19,230
| 22–53
|- bgcolor="#bbffbb"
| 76
| April 4
| @ Toronto
| 
| Corey Maggette (31)
| Anthony Morrow (10)
| Stephen Curry (12)
| Air Canada Centre17,509
| 23–53
|- bgcolor="#ffcccc"
| 77
| April 6
| @ Washington
| 
| Stephen Curry (27)
| Anthony Morrow (7)
| Curry, Tolliver (4)
| Verizon Center14,721
| 23–54
|- bgcolor="#bbffbb"
| 78
| April 7
| @ Minnesota
| 
| Anthony Tolliver (34)
| Curry, Tolliver (8)
| Stephen Curry (14)
| Target Center15,863
| 24–54
|- bgcolor="#ffcccc"
| 79
| April 10
| @ L.A. Clippers
| 
| Stephen Curry (29)
| Anthony Tolliver (10)
| Maggette, Turiaf (5)
| Staples Center17,476
| 24–55
|- bgcolor="#bbffbb"
| 80
| April 11
| Oklahoma City
| 
| Monta Ellis (27)
| Anthony Tolliver (13)
| Stephen Curry (7)
| Oracle Arena18,940
| 25–55
|- bgcolor="#ffcccc"
| 81
| April 13
| Utah
| 
| Devean George (21)
| Tolliver, Williams (9)
| Curry, Ellis (6)
| Oracle Arena19,230
| 25–56
|- bgcolor="#bbffbb"
| 82
| April 14
| @ Portland
| 
| Stephen Curry (42)
| Anthony Tolliver (15)
| Stephen Curry (8)
| Rose Garden20,482
| 26–56

Player statistics

Regular season

|-
| 
| 9 || 7 || 25.7 || .545 || .370 || .679 || 4.6 || 1.1 || .6 || 1.0 || 13.9
|-
| 
| 1 || 0 || 23.0 || style=";"| .667 || 1.000 || . || 2.0 || 3.0 || .0 || .0 || 11.0
|-
| 
| 33 || 29 || 23.1 || .591 || . || .160 || style=";"| 7.8 || 1.7 || .6 || 1.3 || 5.0
|-
| 
| style=";"| 80 || style=";"| 77 || 36.2 || .462 || .437 || .885 || 4.5 || style=";"| 5.9 || 1.9 || .2 || 17.5
|-
| 
| 64 || 64 || style=";"| 41.4 || .449 || .338 || .753 || 4.0 || 5.3 || style=";"| 2.2 || .4 || style=";"| 25.5
|-
| 
| 45 || 4 || 16.9 || .432 || .390 || .696 || 2.5 || .7 || .9 || .2 || 5.4
|-
| 
| 60 || 9 || 13.1 || .502 || .000 || .754 || 2.8 || .6 || .2 || .6 || 4.5
|-
| 
| 9 || 9 || 33.3 || .421 || .275 || .703 || 3.9 || 4.7 || 1.6 || .7 || 16.6
|-
| 
| 4 || 1 || 27.0 || .344 || .182 || .667 || 4.0 || 3.8 || .8 || .3 || 7.0
|-
| 
| 5 || 0 || 13.2 || .643 || .333 || .800 || .4 || 1.4 || 1.2 || .0 || 6.2
|-
| 
| 70 || 49 || 29.7 || .516 || .260 || .835 ||  5.3 || 2.5 || .7 || .1 || 19.8
|-
| 
| 10 || 2 || 27.6 || .364 || .323 || .762 || 4.7 || .9 || .8 || .0 || 9.0
|-
| 
| 23 || 20 || 17.7 || .600 || . || .636 || 3.0 || 1.6 || .2 || .6 || 5.0
|-
| 
| 69 || 37 || 29.2 || .468 || style=";"| .456 || style=";"| .886 || 3.8 || 1.5 || .9 || .2 || 13.0
|-
| 
| 33 || 20 || 23.0 || .385 || .267 || .762 || 4.5 || 1.2 || .8 || .2 || 6.6
|-
| 
| 33 || 8 || 22.7 || .443 || .200 || .801 || 6.5 || 1.3 || .8 || style=";"| 1.5 || 11.6
|-
| 
| 44 || 29 || 32.3 || .431 || .331 || .769 || 7.3 || 2.0 || .7 || .8 || 12.3
|-
| 
| 42 || 20 || 20.8 || .582 || .000 || .474 || 4.5 || 2.1 || .5 || 1.3 || 4.9
|-
| 
| 65 || 15 || 27.5 || .468 || .310 || .771 || 2.6 || 2.8 || 1.6 || .1 || 10.3
|-
| 
| 24 || 10 || 32.6 || .495 || .359 || .839 || 4.6 || 2.8 || 1.0 || .3 || 15.2
|}

Transactions

Trades

Free agency

Re-signed

Additions

Subtractions

Awards

References

External links

 2009–10 Golden State Warriors season at Basketball Reference

Golden State Warriors seasons
Golden State
Golden
Golden